The Wogamus languages are a pair of closely related languages, 
Wogamusin and Chenapian.

They are classified among the Sepik languages of northern Papua New Guinea; Malcolm Ross and William A. Foley (2018) place them in the Upper Sepik branch of that family.

The Wogamus languages are spoken along the banks of the Wogamush River and Sepik River in western East Sepik Province, just to the east of the Iwam languages.

Noun classes
Wogamus languages have noun classes reminiscent of those found in Bantu languages. Noun classes in Wogamusin and Chenapian are listed below, with Wogamusin -um ‘three’ and Chenapian -mu ‘three’ used as examples.

{| 
! Class no. !! Semantic category !! Wogamusin prefix !! Chenapian prefix !! Wogamusin example !! Chenapian example
|-
! 1
| humans || s(i)- || s(i)- || s-um || si-mu
|-
! 2
| higher animals: dogs, pigs, etc. || r- || gw- || r-um || gw-umu
|-
! 3
| plants, trees, vines, etc. || b- || b- || b-um || b-umu
|-
! 4
| no specific pattern || h- || n- || h-um || n-əmu
|-
! 5
| no specific pattern || ŋgw- || kw- || ŋgw-um || kw-umu
|}

Vocabulary comparison
The following basic vocabulary words are from the Trans-New Guinea database. The Wogamusin data is from Foley (2005) and Laycock (1968), and the Chenapian data is from SIL field notes (1983).

{| class="wikitable sortable"
! gloss !! Chenapian !! Wogamusin
|-
! head
| toapᵒ; tuwap || towam
|-
! hair
| taoɛnavon; taunabon || 
|-
! ear
| gwabuo; ugwabə || mam
|-
! eye
| džinano; ǰinino || li
|-
! nose
| mɨnɨk; munɩk || boliŋ
|-
! tooth
| diu; duɨʔ || ndəl; ndɨl
|-
! tongue
| taun; ton || taliyen
|-
! leg
| soʷanaup; šonawəp || su
|-
! louse
| damian; dəmiaʔ || tetak
|-
! dog
| gwara; ogwara || wal
|-
! pig
| kᵘo; ku || 
|-
! bird
| džɛosiʔ; ǰɛoši || yah
|-
! egg
| noə; ṣⁱu no || 
|-
! blood
| ne; nᵊe || noh
|-
! bone
| dža; ǰa· || rubwi
|-
! skin
| bɩn; bön || mbe
|-
! breast
| mu; muʔ || muk
|-
! tree
| məntəp; montoap || mbotom
|-
! man
| tama; tamö || tam
|-
! woman
| tauwo; tawö || taw
|-
! sun
| džabɨn; ǰaƀan || yam
|-
! moon
| nu || luh
|-
! water
| džoʔ; ǰoʔ || yək; yɨk
|-
! fire
| un || kur
|-
! stone
| nogɛrao; noguařo || noŋg
|-
! road, path
| uni || 
|-
! name
| tamgu || 
|-
! one
| nař; sⁱərəʔ || a (M); ed (F)
|-
! two
| ǰⁱək; nɛsi; ṣiṣi || nwis
|}

Footnotes

References

 
Upper Sepik languages